The Labouring Classes Lodging Houses Act 1851 (14 & 15 Vict c 34), sometimes (like the Common Lodging Houses Act 1851) known as the Shaftesbury Act, is an Act of the Parliament of the United Kingdom. It is one of the principal British Housing Acts. It gave boroughs and vestries the power to raise funds via local rates or Public Works Loan Commissioners to build lodging houses for unmarried working (as opposed to unemployed) people. The Act takes its name from Anthony Ashley-Cooper, 7th Earl of Shaftesbury.

References
Robert Anstruther Strange. Lodging Houses Acts. The Common Lodging Houses Act, 1851, and the Labouring Classes Lodging Houses Act, 1851. Shaw and Sons. Fetter Lane, London. 1851. Google Books.

Acts of the Parliament of the United Kingdom concerning England and Wales
United Kingdom Acts of Parliament 1851